is a fictional character from the Metal Gear series created by Hideo Kojima and developed and published by Konami. He is depicted as a former Green Beret and highly skilled special operations soldier engaged in solo stealth and espionage missions, who is often tasked with destroying models of the bipedal nuclear weapon-armed mecha known as Metal Gear. Controlled by the player, he must act alone, supported via radio by commanding officers and specialists. While his first appearances in the original Metal Gear games were references to Hollywood films, the Metal Gear Solid series has given a consistent design by artist Yoji Shinkawa alongside an established personality while also exploring his relationship with his father and mentor Big Boss.

During the Metal Gear Solid games, the character has been voiced by voice actor Akio Ōtsuka in the Japanese version and by Canadian actor David Hayter in the English version. He also appeared in Super Smash Bros. Brawl and Super Smash Bros. Ultimate. Considered to be one of the most iconic protagonists in video game history, Snake has been acclaimed by critics, with his personality and both Ōtsuka's and Hayter's voice acting being noted as primary factors of the character's appeal.

Characteristics
In the early games, Solid Snake's visual appearances were references to popular actors. He was given his own consistent design in Metal Gear Solid. He also establishes Philanthropy, an anti-Metal Gear organization carrying the motto "To let the world be", with his friend Otacon. In Metal Gear Solid 4: Guns of the Patriots, he has access to different disguises to make him look like other characters, as well as his younger self.

Snake possesses an IQ of 180 and is fluent in six languages. Solid Snake has been on the battlefield for most of his life, and says that it is the only place he feels truly alive. He is a hardened veteran, burying his emotions within himself during missions, every one of which has different motives. He is also immediately shown as a loner, often with no intentions of taking orders from anyone anymore and he shows no sign of longing for the army or the country he was part of. However, along with these traits he has a more human side, being flirtatious, self-sacrificing and with a strong belief that even on a battlefield friendship and love can flourish, and that violence is not glorious. Snake's perceived stance on violence may be a case of denial, as Snake's enemies and at least one of his allies have claimed that he enjoys killing, and label him as more evil than the people he has killed.  When he is not on duty, he acts as a musher.

Appearances

Video games

Metal Gear & Metal Gear 2: Solid Snake
Metal Gear (released in 1987) introduces Snake, a rookie recruit of the elite special forces unit FOXHOUND. Snake is sent by FOXHOUND leader Big Boss into the rogue nation Outer Heaven to rescue missing teammate Gray Fox and discover who or what the "Metal Gear" is, mentioned in Fox's last transmission. As his mission progresses, Snake finds out that he has been set up; Big Boss's phantom intended to use the experimental, nuclear-armed TX-55 Metal Gear to establish Outer Heaven as a nuclear power. After destroying the Metal Gear, Snake confronts and defeats Big Boss's phantom.

The sequel Metal Gear 2: Solid Snake (initially released only in Japan in 1990) sees Solid Snake called up to infiltrate a heavily fortified enemy base in Zanzibar Land. Zanzibar Land has aggravated an international oil crisis and declared themselves a nuclear power by kidnapping Dr. Kio Marv after the creation of a bio-engineered algae that produces an oil substitute, and the Metal Gear original designer Dr. Pettrovich Madnar. Snake infiltrates the base and discovers that Pettrovich as well as Fox has defected to Zanzibar Land, and that Zanzibar Land is led by Big Boss. Snake destroys Metal Gear D, and defeats both Fox and Big Boss.

Metal Gear Solid / The Twin Snakes
Metal Gear Solid and its remake sees Solid Snake pulled out of retirement by Colonel Roy Campbell in a mission to deal with the "Sons of Big Boss" who, under Liquid Snake's leadership, seized an isolated American nuclear weapons disposal facility on Shadow Moses Island. Snake's mission is to retrieve two hostages (Donald Anderson and Kenneth Baker). Despite both Anderson's and Baker's deaths, Snake infiltrates and learns about Metal Gear REX after meeting up with rookie soldier Meryl Silverburgh and REX's engineer Hal Emmerich, and having confrontations with the Cyborg Ninja. 

As the game progresses, Snake confronts and defeats each member of the corrupt faction of FOXHOUND (consisting of Revolver Ocelot, Decoy Octopus, Psycho Mantis, Sniper Wolf, Vulcan Raven, and the Genome Soldiers), is able to destroy REX, and personally confronts Liquid. During their fight, it is revealed that Solid and Liquid are twin brothers, artificially conceived from Big Boss's genes during the "Les Enfants Terribles" government project designed to create the perfect soldier, in which one brother was genetically modified to be superior over the other. Liquid harbors a strong resentment towards Snake since Solid was given their father's dominant "soldier genes" and Liquid was cast aside. After a grueling series of battles, Liquid dies from the FOXDIE virus that was previously implanted into Snake by Naomi Hunter in order to wipe out FOXHOUND and the Genome soldiers without risking any damage to REX and the Genome soldiers for retrieval. In the end, it is revealed that Liquid got Big Boss's superior "soldier genes" while Solid was actually the inferior one.

Metal Gear Solid 2: Sons of Liberty
Metal Gear Solid 2: Sons of Liberty shows Solid Snake as the playable character during the game's extensive prologue sequence in which he is sent by Otacon's anti-proliferation organization Philanthropy to infiltrate a cargo tanker and photograph Metal Gear RAY. During the operation, however, RAY is hijacked and the tanker destroyed, with Snake apparently dead and framed for the deed. During the game's main portion, Solidus Snake steals Snake's identity, and leads the "Sons of Liberty" (consisting of Revolver Ocelot, Fortune, Fatman, Vamp and Olga Gurlukovich) while Snake himself uses the pseudonym  as a non-playable character who assists rookie agent Raiden through the remote offshore Big Shell facility and in taking down Solidus and RAY while also learning about the Patriots.

Metal Gear Solid 4: Guns of the Patriots

The PlayStation 3 game Metal Gear Solid 4: Guns of the Patriots features an aged incarnation of the character that is once again the protagonist identified as  during the game. Thanks to Otacon and Sunny, he wears a sneaking suit outfitted with "Octocamo" technology, which allows him to blend with his environment, as well as a face mask which alters his appearance. Snake is once again enlisted by his old friend Roy Campbell to assassinate Liquid Ocelot, CEO of a giant mother company that are trying to take control of the Patriots' AIs. 

During his final mission, he also learns from Naomi Hunter that his life has been artificially shortened as part of the cloning process so that his genes can't be used as a weapon in later research. As a result, Snake has the physical appearance of an elderly man, despite being only forty-two years old. Snake and his allies are forced to destroy the Patriots' AI and fight through Ocelot's forces until Snake defeats Liquid's doppelgänger in hand-to-hand combat. Learning that his DNA contains a mutated FOXDIE virus that might trigger an epidemic, Snake tries to commit suicide, however, he is approached by Big Boss telling Snake that he still has a chance to live "not as a snake but as a man", making up with his father. 

After Big Boss's death from a new FOXDIE strain, David decides to live out the remainder of his life in peace, vowing that he will live long enough to see what the future holds for the new world he has helped create.

Other appearances
The Metal Gear Solid prequels alludes to Solid Snake's existence; Metal Gear Solid: Portable Ops has him briefly alluded in a prophetic vision as Naked Snake's "son [that] will save the world" (after either Liquid or Solidus as Big Boss's "son [that] will bring the world to ruin"), and Metal Gear Solid: Peace Walker shows Kazuhira Miller mentioning the "twin sons" that are two years old at the time.

Solid Snake is featured/mentioned in Metal Gear Solid V: Ground Zeroes and Metal Gear Solid V: The Phantom Pain. The unlockable bonus mission "Déjà Vu" on the PlayStation platform and later Xbox platform of Ground Zeroes in which Naked Snake must re-enact situations from the original Metal Gear Solid game and answer a series of trivia questions after fulfilling the mission. If all the questions are answered correctly on the Normal difficulty setting, the mission can be replayed with his low-polygon model from Metal Gear Solid in place of his father's standard character model. The Phantom Pain also shows that his low-polygon model from Metal Gear Solid can be an alternate outfit for Venom Snake after transferring the save data from Ground Zeroes. David is also alluded to in association with Eli during a conversation between Big Boss and Revolver Ocelot.

Other Metal Gear media
Solid Snake also serves as the protagonist in Snake's Revenge, a sequel to the original Metal Gear for the NES released for the western market in 1990 and developed without Kojima's involvement. Set three years after the events of the Outer Heaven incident, Snake's Revenge has Snake leading a team of FOX HOUND operatives as they infiltrate an undisclosed enemy base where the Metal Gear weapon is being mass-produced. Snake is addressed by the military rank of Lieutenant and starts the game already equipped with a handgun and a combat knife, in contrast to the first game, where Snake had to procure all of his weapons on-site.

After the success of the original Metal Gear Solid, KCEJ produced a trilogy of Metal Gear spin-offs for portable platforms set in a parallel universe outside the main Kojima-directed series. All three of these portable games were directed by Shinta Nojiri. The first of these is Metal Gear: Ghost Babel (released outside Japan as Metal Gear Solid), in which Solid Snake must infiltrate a rebuilt Outer Heaven (now called Galuade) to defeat a FOXHOUND-like team of rogue agents called Black Chamber and destroy a stolen Metal Gear prototype, Gander. Although the actual in-game artwork of Ghost Babel was done by Ikuya Nakamura, Yoji Shinkawa provided the promotional art like he did with the original Metal Gear Solid. In the second of these titles, Metal Gear Acid, Snake must retrieve "Pythagoras" from the Lobito Physics and Research Laboratory, in order to satisfy hijackers who have kidnapped presidential candidate Viggo Hach. This mission is complicated by La Clown, an expert mimic who impersonates Snake's contact Teliko, and subtle brainwashing that nearly convinces him that he is Hans Davis, a ruthless scientist that worked at the Lobito facility. He overcomes both and contacts the real Teliko, then destroys the latest model of Metal Gear, Metal Gear KODOQUE. Metal Gear Acid 2 features a main character who is not the real version, but a clone created from tissue samples of the man from the original Metal Gear Acid, following the events of the Lobito Island mission; the Solid Snake from the original Acid is implied to be dead in the sequel.

The character appears in his Old Snake form as a playable character in Metal Gear Solid: Portable Ops Plus, a stand-alone expansion to the Portable Ops focusing on online play. In Metal Gear Rising: Revengeance, the VR Missions DLC add-on for the game's Japanese version includes a new weapon that can be used by Raiden known as the Hebidamashi, a talking wooden sword which speaks with Solid Snake's voice (as portrayed by Akio Ōtsuka); the weapon was never made available for the English version.

Outside video games, Solid Snake appeared in the Metal Gear Solid audio drama that focuses on his missions following the battle from Shadow Moses. He also appears in Alex Garner's comic book adaptations of Metal Gear Solid and Metal Gear Solid 2. Raymond Benson's novelizations of these two games also feature Solid Snake; Benson's adaptation of the character frequently focuses on the comical aspects of his characterization. He also appears in Project Itoh's novelization from Metal Gear Solid 4 where his actions are told from Hal Emmerich's point of view.

Other video games and media
Solid Snake has appeared in a number of other games, including other Konami games. Hideo Kojima makes a habit of referencing his previous work. In the Kojima-produced Boktai 2: Solar Boy Django (and Shin Bokura no Taiyō: Gyakushū no Sabata), Snake appears as an unnamed character who sells items to the player. Konami's Evolution Skateboarding features Snake and Raiden as hidden characters, as well as two stages set in the Big Shell (the skateboarding minigame in Metal Gear Solid 2: Substance is a demo of Evolution Skateboarding composed exclusively of these elements). Solid Snake also appears in both halves of a crossover between the Metal Gear and Ape Escape franchises: the Ape Escape monkeys appear with Solid Snake in the "Snake vs. Monkey" minigame featured in Metal Gear Solid 3: Snake Eater. In turn, Snake appears in the corresponding Metal Gear Solid minigame featured in Ape Escape 3, where he is rescued by Pipo Snake (Snake's character design in this minigame is taken directly from Naked Snake's).

He has also appeared in several cross-company fighting games. In DreamMix TV World Fighters, Solid Snake appears as a playable character alongside other Konami, Hudson Soft and Takara characters such as Bomberman and Optimus Prime. Similarly, in Super Smash Bros. Brawl, the third installment from the popular fighting game series Super Smash Bros., Solid Snake appeared as a playable fighter alongside Sega character Sonic the Hedgehog and a variety of characters from Nintendo franchises such as Mario, The Legend of Zelda, and Donkey Kong. Brawl Director Masahiro Sakurai has stated that Snake was included under Kojima's request, and that he had talked to Sakurai about adding Snake to the roster of the previous game Super Smash Bros. Melee, which did not materialize due to the game being too far into production. Snake returned as a playable fighter in Super Smash Bros. Ultimate, after being absent in Super Smash Bros. for Nintendo 3DS and Wii U. In addition, Snake has appeared as a playable character in other Konami crossover titles, such as New International Track & Field and Super Bomberman R. 

Old Snake has appeared in the Japanese version of Scribblenauts, having been published by Konami in that region. Customizations in Media Molecule's LittleBigPlanet for the PlayStation 3 allow the player character, Sackboy, to take on the appearance of Old Snake. One of the robots in Astro's Playroom and one of the Villagers in An Egg's Guide to Minecraft each take on the appearance of Solid Snake using his signature cardboard box, the latter voiced by Dan Lloyd. In December 2020, Paul W. Anderson stated that his 2020 film Monster Hunter had been based on a 2010 Metal Gear Solid: Peace Walker crossover event with Monster Hunter Freedom Unite, in which a military squad briefly faced monsters from the Monster Hunter series, with Snake's equivalent in the narrative, US Army Ranger Artemis, being portrayed by Milla Jovovich. 

Oscar Isaac will be portraying Solid Snake in the upcoming film adaptation of Metal Gear Solid.

Creation and development
Solid Snake was apparently named after the fictional special forces operative Snake Plissken, Kurt Russell's character in Escape from New York. However, Kojima revealed in March 2014 that the character's name origins were something else. According to Kojima, he was given the "Snake" name because snakes are a symbol of stealth. Additionally, the "Solid" part of his code-name was given to give the opposite impression of a soft image. Kojima has compared Snake's personality with Lupin III of Monkey Punch's Lupin III franchise, stating that in "MGS, Snake became this sharp-tongued, Lupin III-like guy who flirted with women and told lots of jokes". His real name David is a tribute to the film 2001: A Space Odyssey that has a character with the same name (and coincidentally shared with his English voice actor David Hayter). Kojima later described Snake's role in the original Metal Gear as the "player's presence", contrasting the defined personality acquired in Metal Gear Solid.

In addition to expanding Solid Snake's backstory, as the first Metal Gear game to feature voice acting, Metal Gear Solid established his characteristic voice and appearance.

Various scenes from the games relate Solid Snake's ideals with Hideo Kojima's. During Metal Gear Solid 2, Snake encourages Raiden to trust himself in making his own choices with the former representing the veteran developer and the latter the younger staff who are to decide whether a sequel to the series would be made without Kojima. In Metal Gear Solid 4, Snake tries to protect the next generation by stopping Ocelot which represented Kojima working with the staff to avoid bugs from occurring within the game. Kojima introduced the cloning origins of Snake to Metal Gear Solid in order to provide Snake with an adversary who would be his equal, since the story, being a continuation of the original MSX2 games, established Snake as an experienced soldier. Kojima explained that his decision to introduce a new playable character in Snake's place for Metal Gear Solid 2 was done in order to develop Snake from another character's perspective, but also to avoid treating Snake as a rookie by having a new character be instructed via Codec instead. Snake was written to act as father figure not only to protect those he cares but also leave a message for the future generation despite his imminent death. As a pacifist message, Snake's stress increases when killing enemies. Snake and Otacon were meant to die in the game, with Kojima being inspired by the movie Sacco & Vanzetti in regards to how the duo use death as a penalty for how they are criminals rather than heroes. While the novel retained this idea, the ending in the game was changed with Snake and Otacon surviving. According to Ryan Payton of Konami at the time, Metal Gear Solid 4 is the final canonical Metal Gear game to feature Solid Snake as the main character. Kojima himself stated that the series will continue. Despite previously stating that he does not want the character to be handled by anyone else, in an interview with French gaming magazine IG

Design

Much as Metal Gear began as a pastiche of action movies of the time with Solid Snake as a pastiche of contemporary action movie heroes. On the cover artwork of the original Metal Gear game, he resembles Kyle Reese, as played by Michael Biehn in The Terminator (although Kojima claims to have no involvement in the production of the game's packaging illustration), and the in-game portrait of Metal Gear 2: Solid Snake resembles Mel Gibson.

Yoji Shinkawa's Solid Snake design, characterized by his navy blue bandanna and "sneaking suit", would serve as the template for all future incarnations in later Metal Gear games. According to Shinkawa, Snake's physique in Metal Gear Solid was based on that of action star Jean-Claude Van Damme, while his facial appearance inspired by actor Christopher Walken. Shinkawa described his rendition of Solid Snake from Metal Gear Solid as a "middle ground" between the younger Snake who was in the cover artwork of the first Metal Gear and the middle-aged Snake from the MSX2 version of Metal Gear 2. For the initial events from the Big Shell chapter from Metal Gear Solid 2, Snake's visual appearance was sightly modified with his hair being more blonde, and his appearance somewhat resembling the Man with No Name (as portrayed by Clint Eastwood). Snake was one of the characters easiest to draw by Shinkawa as he notes that his appearance is consistent despite suffering minor changes across the games.

By the time Metal Gear Solid 4 started development, Kojima told Shinkawa about his idea of making Snake look elderly, which surprised the designer. Once Shinkawa showed his artwork of Old Snake to the staff, they were all also surprised by the idea of playing as an old version of the character. However, they were satisfied with the end product as the staff began to like the character. In Metal Gear Solid 4, one of Kojima's endings would have had Snake and Otacon turn themselves in for breaking the law, and subsequently they would be convicted and executed. However, comments from Kojima's staff who were disappointed with his death resulted in the character's survival.  In Metal Gear Solid 4, Old Snake is modelled after Lee Van Cleef who appeared in Escape from New York.

Voice actors

In the games, Solid Snake has been voiced by Akio Ōtsuka in the Japanese version, and by David Hayter in the English adaptations. When working in Captain Planet, Hayter met the casting director of this show was Kris Zimmerman, who would later also be the voice over director for Metal Gear games. When debuting in Metal Gear Solid, Hayter was impressed by the game's cutscenes and the amount of dialogue. One of Snake's lines that Hayter liked was "I just didn't expect a world-class designer of military technology to be so… cute." when Snake interacts with Mei Ling, believing it showed a more fun side of him. Solid Snake's English voice was inspired by Hayter's experience with Japan's storytelling, resulting in minor changes for the script. Hayter himself felt shocked when Sons of Liberty was released as the narrative focused more on newcomer Raiden rather than him. Although there were no news about Snake's future role in Metal Gear, the actor believes Guns of the Patriots gave the character a proper closure. One of Snake's final scenes in this game bothered Hayter as during the ending the character hesitates to kill himself despite having killed multiple enemies in fights. Nevertheless, Hayter stated that he "loves" the character he was given to portray.

Other than the aforementioned voice actors, Solid Snake has also been dubbed in four different languages for the European localization of Metal Gear Solid; in French by Emmanuel Bonami, in German by Stephan Grothgar, in Italian by Alessandro Ricci, and in Spanish by Alfonso Vallés.

Reception

Popularity
Solid Snake's character was very well received by gaming media. Retro Gamer included him in the section "top ten forces of good" in their 2004 list of top 50 retro game heroes. In 2005, Electronic Gaming Monthly listed Solid Snake as number one as the top ten video game characters of all time. Solid Snake appeared in multiple GameFAQs "Character Battle" contests, and was runner-up in three: the "Character Battle V" in 2006,  the "Character Battle VII" in 2008, and the "Character Battle IX" in 2013. In an Oricon poll from 2008, his character was voted as the most popular video game character in Japan, tying with Nintendo's Pikachu. In a Famitsu poll in 2010, Solid Snake was voted by readers as the most popular video game character. His character was amongst the last 16 contestants on the greatest video game hero on GameSpot contest held in 2009, and lost out to Gordon Freeman on a tiebreaker. In the Guinness World Records Gamer's Edition from 2011, Solid Snake was voted as the fourth most popular video game character. In 2011, Empire ranked Solid Snake as the 19th greatest video game character, adding that "beginning as an action pastiche, he swiftly evolved into his very own character".  In 2007, ScrewAttack ranked him as the sixth "coolest" character in video games. 1UP.com listed him second in the list of top video game smokers, while GamesRadar placed him at the top of their 2009 list of manliest men in video game history. Complex ranked him as fourth on the list of top "pervs" in games in 2012 and as the seventh greatest soldier in video games in 2013. In 2021, Chris Morgan for Yardbarker described Snake as one of "the most memorable characters from old school Nintendo games".

Critical response
Critics have commented on his traits and appearance, often praising Solid Snake for his appealing personality. Solid Snake's endurance in the face of extreme punishment was even made the focus of a comedy article in the satirical newspaper The Onion. In 2013, Rich Knight and Gus Turner from Complex ranked him as the ninth best video game mascot, adding that he represents "deep, human emotion that other characters fail to match." IGN also remarked their rivalry, saying "Few rivalries in games have spanned as massive and confusing a timeline as Solid Snake and Liquid Snake".

Solid Snake's Metal Gear Solid 2 design was at the bottom of the worst game character makeovers list by GamePro, condemning his conversion in hairstyle in comparison to his Metal Gear Solid design, and was also at the top of IGN's list of the worst video game haircuts. Before Metal Gear Solid 3: Snake Eater, the character was thought to be the game's protagonist because of his physical resemblances with Naked Snake. However, later previews speculated how was it impossible for Solid Snake to be in the game's settings, leading to the conclusion it was a young incarnation of his father. A comparison between Solid Snake's and Big Boss's characters was made by IGN in article "Stars Thunderdome: Snake vs. Big Boss."

The character's appearance in Metal Gear Solid 4 has received mostly positive opinions. Before it was released, various speculations were made regarding his role. As he was the only one who suffered from a drastic change in appearance, IGN commented that the most famous rumor was the one of his body deteriorating across the game. Moreover, since it had been announced it would be his last appearance, IGN and GamesRadar wondered whether the character would die during the game and if Raiden would replace him following his death. GamesRadar commented that his character was one of the few gaming characters that aged across video games. GamePro also listed Old Snake as one of the biggest surprises from the game, as the character was found interesting in contrast to pessimistic thoughts they had before the game's release. GameDaily listed the "old hero" as one of their list of top video game archetypes, using the old version of the character as an example of this. PLAY gave praise to his moustache considering how highly detailed it is, and represents the change from Solid Snake's character. On the other hand, 1UP.com placed Old Snake third in their 2009 list of most gracelessly aging characters as it gave negative messages about aging. In 2013, Complex included Old Snake among the ten video game characters who look like sex offenders, but La Nueva España included him among the top ten sexiest video game characters of both genders.

GameDaily made Solid Snake top their Smash Bros. characters list, while PLAY listed him as one of the characters they wanted to be playable in Mortal Kombat. The character customization in Soulcalibur IV that allowed to create Solid Snake was listed by UGO as one of the best ones from the series owing to his popularity within gamers. Gavin Jasper of Den of Geek ranked Solid Snake as 12th of Super Smash Bros. Ultimate characters, and stated that "bringing Snake in Smash Bros. was an act of pure dominance." Jeremy Parish of Polygon ranked 73 fighters from Super Smash Bros. Ultimate "from garbage to glorious", listing Solid Snake as 18th, stating that "The legendary super-soldier Solid Snake remains one of gaming's greatest and most tragic figures." People expressed some disappointment on Super Smash Bros. Ultimate when Solid Snake wears a skintight stealth suit, and the rendition being completely changed. Leaving the character's butt being reduced. HobbyConsolas named Snake as third of their "The 30 best heroes of the last 30 years."

Akio Otsuka's and David Hayter's performances as Solid Snake's voice actors has received praise. Ōtsuka remembers being surprised during his debut as a result of the large amount of dialogue Solid Snake was given. Hayter's performance was called one of the greatest in gaming as well as one of the character's most recognizable traits. In 2013, Game Informer ranked Hayter's role as Solid Snake as the seventh most memorable character voice in video games for "a portrayal that's considered to be a real classic in the history of video game voice acting".

Controversy
In the Tekken 7 Evo 2019 finals, the character was used to have a chat with developer Katsuhiro Harada. The organizers of Evo stated this was a joke as many fans believed it was a hint for a possible usage of the character as downloadable content. David Hayter complained about this joke as Evo did not consult Konami or him when using the audio.

References

Fictional assassins in video games
Characters designed by Yoji Shinkawa
Clone characters in video games
Fictional activists
Fictional American people in video games
Fictional characters with disfigurements
Fictional characters with post-traumatic stress disorder
Fictional attempted suicides
Fictional Central Intelligence Agency personnel
Fictional United States Army Special Forces personnel
Fictional Gulf War veterans
Fictional patricides
Fictional guerrillas
Fictional gunfighters in video games
Fictional marksmen and snipers
Fictional special forces personnel
Fictional super soldiers
Genetically engineered characters in video games
Fictional characters with accelerated ageing
Fictional knife-fighters
Male characters in video games
Fictional martial artists in video games
Fictional mercenaries in video games
Metal Gear characters
Fictional military personnel in video games
Fictional military spies
Science fiction film characters 
Fictional secret agents and spies in video games
Fictional soldiers in video games
Fictional torturers and interrogators
Super Smash Bros. fighters
Twin characters in video games
Video game characters introduced in 1987
Video game mascots
Konami protagonists